The Ministry of Mines and Energy is a top-level government entity in several countries, responsible for the oversight of mining and energy production and consumption. The following articles cover individual Ministries of Mines and Energy:
Ministry of Energy and Mining (Algeria), of Algeria
Ministry of Mines and Energy (Brazil), of Brazil
Burundi Ministry of Energy and Mines, of Burundi
Ministry of Mines and Energy (Cambodia), of Cambodia
Ministry of Energy, Mines and Resources, of Canada
Ministry of Mines and Energy (Colombia), of Colombia
Ministry of Energy and Mines (Cuba), of Cuba
Ministry of Mines and Energy (Ghana), of Ghana
Ministry of Energy and Mines (Peru), of Peru
Ministry of Mines and Energy (Togo), of Togo